California is the third studio album by American indie rock band American Music Club. It was released on November 10, 1988 on Frontier Records.

The album was included in the book 1001 Albums You Must Hear Before You Die. In the album's article in the book, reviewer Arnar Eggert Thorradsen, from Iceland's daily newspaper Morgunblaðið, describes the album as the band's "definitive statement."

Track listing

Personnel
American Music Club
 Mark Eitzel – vocals, guitars
 Tom Mallon – drums, production, engineering
 Dan Pearson – bass
 Vudi – guitar, accordion
Additional musicians
 Bruce Kaphan – pedal steel
 Lisa Davis – bass on "Firefly"
Artwork and design
 Bobby Neel Adams – photography

References

1988 albums
American Music Club albums
Frontier Records albums